Kalu (also Romanized as Kalū) is a village in Mehranrud-e Markazi Rural District, in the Central District of Bostanabad County, East Azerbaijan Province, Iran. At the 2006 census, its population was 73, in 14 families.

References 

Populated places in Bostanabad County